Bamford Edge is an overhang of gritstone rock that sticks out north of the village of Bamford, Hope Valley, in the English county of Derbyshire. The first ascent of "Smoked Salmon", which is graded as E8 7b was made by British climber Johnny Dawes.

Bamford Edge has numerous trails across it and, on a clear day, provides views of almost all of the Hope Valley. Some trails come out at New Road opposite the Yorkshire Bridge public house.

References

External links 

Detailed description of climbing the Edge
Photograph

Mountains and hills of Derbyshire
Tourist attractions in Derbyshire
Climbing areas of England